Lema confusa is a species of leaf beetle in the family Chrysomelidae. It is found in the Caribbean Sea, Central America, North America, and South America.

References

Further reading

 

Criocerinae
Articles created by Qbugbot
Beetles described in 1835